Slocum's River Reserve is a  open space preserve co-managed by the land conservation non-profit organizations The Trustees of Reservations and The Dartmouth Natural Resources Trust. The property includes  of frontage along the tidal Slocum's River in Dartmouth, Massachusetts,  of trails, woodland, agricultural fields, and pasture. The reserve is open to the public.

History
Slocum's River Reserve was formerly known as Island View Farm; it was purchased in 1999 by The Trustees of Reservations and Dartmouth Natural Resources Trust.

Conservation and recreation

The farmland produces corn, alfalfa, and horticultural nursery stock and are used to graze livestock. The property trailhead is located on Horseneck Road in Dartmouth. The reserve is a popular birding spot.

References

External links
The Trustees of Reservations
Trail map
Dartmouth Natural Resources Trust
Buzzard's Bay Coalition

The Trustees of Reservations
Protected areas of Bristol County, Massachusetts
Open space reserves of Massachusetts
Protected areas established in 1999
1999 establishments in Massachusetts